Shonga is a rural locality (a selo) in Gorodetskoye Rural Settlement, Kichmengsko-Gorodetsky District, Vologda Oblast, Russia. The population was 492 as of 2002. There are 9 streets.

Geography 
Shonga is located 11 km southwest of Kichmengsky Gorodok (the district's administrative centre) by road. Volkovo is the nearest rural locality.

References 

Rural localities in Kichmengsko-Gorodetsky District